Charles Williams Cain (born March 28, 1975) is an American columnist, political analyst, and sports commentator. He is currently the co-host of Fox & Friends Weekend on Fox News. Previously, Cain had been a contributor for ESPN, joining the network in March 2015, working with the features unit and E:60 and appearing on First Take. He was the host of The Will Cain Show on ESPN Radio, which ran from January 2, 2018, to June 26, 2020. He has also been a contributor for Blaze Media and CNN, appearing frequently on Soledad O'Brien's morning program Starting Point.

Early life and education
Cain was born and raised in Sherman, Texas, near Dallas. Attending Pepperdine University, Cain played one year on the water polo team and graduated cum laude with a bachelor's degree in telecommunications in 1997. On the Pepperdine water polo team, Cain was a walk-on who scored his only goal in 1996, in a game against UC Santa Barbara. Cain said of the experience in 2010, "Pepperdine water polo was extremely accommodating in its development of a walk-on such as me, and that's something positively unique about this program. I almost went to USC, and I'm sure that if I did have a water polo career there it would have been much shorter." In 2000, Cain completed his J.D. degree at the University of Texas School of Law. After law school, Cain moved to a ranch in Montana, where he worked as a ranch hand while trying to write a book.

Media career
Following the death of his father in 2001, Cain returned to the Dallas area to help care for his younger brother. While in Texas, Cain bought two community newspapers and started others before selling them to Stephens Media, publisher of the Las Vegas Review-Journal. Around 2006, Cain founded Quince Media, which published a magazine, website, and expos about quinceañeras.

Cain previously worked as a fill-in host for CNN's In the Arena, where he co-hosted the program with E. D. Hill from February 28, 2011, to August 5, 2011.

Cain began working at ESPN in 2015 as a radio personality, hosting the program Will and Kate with Kate Fagan and serving as a fill-in for other ESPN Radio anchors. He was a frequent contributor to Outside the Lines and eventually became a fill-in host and frequent guest on First Take. Cain then was named co-host of The Ryen Russillo Show but Russillo soon left the show. Cain began hosting his own show, The Will Cain Show, on ESPN Radio in 2018. The Washington Post observed about Cain's ESPN presence in 2018: "Cain's growing profile comes amid consistent charges of liberal bias at ESPN for its coverage of social and political issues in sports." By 2018, Michael McCarthy of Sporting News argued that Cain "provides a valuable balance to ESPN" and noted he "has become a virtual third debate partner with Stephen A. Smith, Max Kellerman and Molly Qerim on First Take.

In 2020, Cain left ESPN to move to Fox News as co-host of Fox & Friends Weekend (along with Jedediah Bila and Pete Hegseth). Cain's last appearance on First Take was on June 24, 2020, and his final episode of The Will Cain Show aired two days later. His first appearance on Fox & Friends Weekend was in August 2020. On April 5, 2021, Cain launched The Will Cain Podcast, combining his commentary in news, politics, and sports.

Political commentary and controversies
Cain was one of ESPN's most conservative voices, although his ESPN show focused mostly on sports. Cain told the Washington Post in 2018, "Has being conservative helped me since I've been here? Of course. ESPN doesn't have a voice like mine." Cain had been critical of Donald Trump; in 2011, while he was at CNN, Cain wrote an op-ed that criticized Trump, Sarah Palin, and populism from a conservative perspective. On a January 2017 episode of First Take, Cain said that he did not vote for Trump in the 2016 election, which he later reiterated in a 2020 interview discussing his move from ESPN to Fox News. In January 2022, Cain criticized the first year of Joe Biden's presidency on his podcast, calling Biden "the worst president of my lifetime."

In March 2019, Cain likened Antonio Brown's contract requests during Brown's trade to the Oakland Raiders as being "like a suicide bomber" while discussing the trade on First Take; the remark prompted criticism.

In April 2019, after the New York Yankees and Philadelphia Flyers ceased using Kate Smith's recordings of "God Bless America" at games due to the deceased singer having sung songs with racist content about African Americans decades before her death, Cain’s take on the situation during First Take that day caused significant controversy among First Take viewers and co-host Stephen A. Smith, claiming it was a “fool’s errand” to apply “modern historical standards” to an event that happened in the 1930s and pointed out that under those standards, President Barack Obama’s statues should be removed due to Obama previously being opposed to LGBT rights before running for president. The New York radio show The Breakfast Club would later give their Donkey of the Day award to Cain the next day in response.

In 2021, after Colin Powell died from complications of COVID-19, Cain questioned the effectiveness of COVID-19 vaccines and vaccine requirements. The 84-year-old Powell was vaccinated against COVID-19 but he was also battling multiple myeloma, a blood cancer that suppresses the immune system.

References

External links
 

1975 births
Living people
American broadcast news analysts
American political commentators
CNN people
Conservatism in the United States
ESPN people
Fox News people
People from Sherman, Texas
Pepperdine University alumni
University of Texas School of Law alumni